The following is a list of the known rulers of the Kingdom of Edom in the Levant.

Descendants of Esau 

Esau עֵשָׂו (Edom אֱדֹֽום) Married three wives 
 Reuel רְעוּאֵֽל By Basemath בָּשְׂמַ֥ת (daughter of Elon the Hittite, wife of Ishmael?) Also called Mahalath (the sister of Nebaioth, the firstborn of Ishmael) Married just after Jacob's flight to Haran
 Nahath נַ֥חַת
 Zerah זֶ֖רַח (father of Jobab, 2nd Duke of Edom?)
 Shammah שַׁמָּ֣ה
 Mizzah מִזָּ֑ה
 Jeush יְע֥וּשׁ By Oholibamah אָהֳלִֽיבָמָה֙ (daughter of Anah עֲנָ֔ה (the wife of Beeri?) the daughter of Zibeon צִבְעֹ֖ון the Hivite). (Also called Judith daughter of Beeri the Hittite) Married just before Jacob's flight to Haran
 Jalam יַעְלָ֖ם
 Korah קֹ֑רַח
 Eliphaz אֱלִיפָ֑ז By Adah עָדָ֗ה daughter of Elon אֵילֹון֙ the Hittite. (possibly the same Eliphaz the Temanite in the Book of Job) Married before Jacob's flight to Haran
 Teman תֵּימָ֣ן
 Omar אֹומָ֔ר
 Zepho צְפֹ֥ו
 Gatam גַעְתָּ֖ם
 Kenaz קְנַֽז
 Amalek עֲמָלֵ֑ק (by his concubine Timna תִמְנַ֣ע the sister of Lotan the son of Seir)

Kings and governors

Non-hereditary kings

Dukes/chiefs

  Timnah (Timna)
  Aliah (Alvah)
 Jetheth
 Oholibamah
 Elah
 Pinon
 Kenaz
 Teman II
 Mibzar
 Magdiel
 Iram
 To Israel c. 990-922
 ?
 To Judah 922 - early 9th century
  ?
 To Assyria 724-612
 Kaus-malaka fl c. 734 (Assyrian name; Edomite name Qos-melek)
 Malik-rammu (Assyrian name; Edomite name Melek-ram) fl. c. 701
 Kaus-gabri fl. c. 680 (Assyrian name; Edomite name Qos-geber)
 To Babylon 612-539
 ?
 Independence 539-c. 275
 ?
 To the Seleucid Empire c. 200-160
 ? c. 270 - c. 200
 Gorigas 160s
 ? 160-109
 Governors of Idumea under the Hasmonean dynasty 109 BC.
 Antipas c. 100-78
 Antipater 78-43

Governors of Idumea under Herod
Note that the Herodian dynasty itself was of Idumaean extraction.

 Joseph ben Antipater (brother of Herod the Great). c. 43-35
 Costobarus (brother-in-law of Herod the Great).......30s
 To Judea directly.................................30s-4
 To Rome..........................................4 BC- AD 60

Governors of Idumea under the Revolutionary government of Judaea 
 Niger the Perean
 Joshua ben Saphas ha-Kohen
 Eleazar ben Hananiah
 To Rome

References 

Edom